John Cochran Nicoll (October 7, 1793 – November 16, 1863) was a United States district judge of the United States District Court for the District of Georgia, the United States District Court for the Northern District of Georgia and the United States District Court for the Southern District of Georgia.

Education and career

Born on October 7, 1793, in Savannah, Georgia, Nicoll attended Litchfield Law School. He entered private practice in Savannah. He was a recorder for Savannah. He was a member of the Georgia House of Representatives. He was solicitor for the Eastern Judicial Circuit of Georgia from 1821 to 1822. He was a Judge of the Savannah City Court from 1824 to 1834, and from 1835 to 1838. He was a Judge of the Superior Court of Georgia for the Eastern Judicial Circuit from 1834 to 1835. He was Mayor of Savannah.

Federal judicial service

Nicoll received a recess appointment from President Martin Van Buren on May 11, 1839, to a seat on the United States District Court for the District of Georgia vacated by Judge Jeremiah La Touche Cuyler. He was nominated to the same position by President Van Buren on January 23, 1840. He was confirmed by the United States Senate on February 17, 1840, and received his commission the same day. Nicoll was reassigned by operation of law to the United States District Court for the Northern District of Georgia and the United States District Court for the Southern District of Georgia on August 11, 1848, to a new joint seat authorized by 9 Stat. 280. His service terminated on January 19, 1861, due to his resignation.

Later career and death

Following his resignation from the federal bench, Nicoll was the Confederate District Attorney for the District of Georgia from 1861 to 1863. He died on November 16, 1863, in Savannah.

References

Sources
 

1793 births
1863 deaths
Mayors of Savannah, Georgia
Georgia (U.S. state) state court judges
Members of the Georgia House of Representatives
Judges of the United States District Court for the District of Georgia
Judges of the United States District Court for the Southern District of Georgia
Judges of the United States District Court for the Northern District of Georgia
United States federal judges appointed by Martin Van Buren
19th-century American judges